The Kingdom of Champasak (Lao: ຈຳປາສັກ [tɕàmpàːsák]) or Bassac, (1713–1904) was a Lao kingdom under Nokasad, a grandson of King Sourigna Vongsa, the last king of Lan Xang and son-in-law of the Cambodian King Chey Chettha IV. Bassac and the neighboring principalities of Attapeu and Stung Treng emerged as power centers under what was later to be described as the Mandala Southeast Asian political model.

History
The kingdom was sited on the eastern or Left Bank of the Mekong, south of the Right Bank principality of Khong Chiam where the Mun River joins; and east of where the Mekong makes a sharp bend to the west to return abruptly and flow southeasterly down to what is now Cambodia. 

Due to scarcity of information from the periods known as the Post-Angkor Period, the Khorat Plateau seems to have been largely depopulated, and Left Bank principalities began to repopulate the Right. In 1718, a Lao emigration in the company of an official in the service of King Nokasad founded Muang Suwannaphum as the first recorded population of Lao in the Chi River valley—indeed anywhere in the interior of the plateau. 

Around 1766, Vorarad-Vongsa, a dignitary in the Kingdom of Vientiane, started a rebellion. His plan failed, but he submitted to the King of Champasak, which led to the conflict between Champasak and Vientiane. 

In 1777, King Taksin of Siam sent an invading army to the Kingdom of Vientiane. The Thai army also attacked Champasak, and the kingdom was occupied without major resistance. King Pothi (Sayakumane) was taken prisoner to Krung Thep (Bangkok). In 1780, King Sayakumane was allowed to return to Champasak as vassal of the Siamese king. 

At the beginning of the 19th century, and ignoring the worldwide agricultural disaster accompanying the 1816 Year Without a Summer, Bassac was said to be on a prosperous trade route as the outlet for cardamon, rubber, wax, resin, skins, horns, and slaves from the east bank to Ubon, Khorat, and Bangkok. The region then fell victim to Siamese and French struggles to extend suzerainty.

After the Laotian Rebellion of 1826–1829, Suwannaphum lost its status and Champasak was reduced to vassalage. The Siamese-Cambodian War of 1831–1834 reduced the entire region to vassalage of the Nguyen dynasty, a situation soon further complicated by the French striving in the same region to establish what was to become French Indochina.

Following the Franco-Siamese War of 1893, the Left Bank fell under French rule as an administrative block, with its royalty stripped of many privileges; French colonial administration of Lao kingdoms impoverished the region. The 1893 treaty called for a twenty-five-kilometer-wide demilitarized zone along the Right Bank, which made Siamese control impossible. It soon became a haven for lawless characters from both banks of the river. Lack of clear chains of authority resulted in turmoil in the whole region, and in what was known to the Siamese side as the "Holy Man's Rebellion".

Ong Keo and Ong Kommandam of the Bolaven Plateau Alak people, led the initial resistance against French control, which evolved into the Holy Man's Rebellion. The concomitant right-bank Holy Man's Rebellion of 1901–1902 was a short-lived phenomenon. Following legal action against captured local leaders of the movement, the Thai government considered the case of the rebellion closed. The right-bank dependencies were absorbed into the Siamese Northeast Monthon, Isan, and the House of Na Champassak continued to rule autonomously. In 1904, prior to the Franco-Siamese Treaty, the kingdom's capital was transferred to French rule and was placed under the control of French Cambodia. Despite historical claims by Cambodia, Champassak lost jurisdiction over the province of Stung Treng and in return regained the city of Champasak. In addition, the provinces of Kontum and Pleiku were ceded to French administration in Annam.

In 1946, when Chao Nhouy or Chao Ratsadanay died, his son Chao Boun Oum Na Champassak became the head of the House of Champassak. He was also appointed as Inspector General for Life in Laos, in lieu of him agreeing not to make a claim on the Lao throne. Boun Oum was forced to leave Laos and become a political refugee in France in 1975. He died in France on March 17, 1980. He had nine children.

Kings of Champassak (1713–1904)
Nokasad (Soysisamout Phoutthangkoun) (1713–1737, grandson of Sourigna Vongsa)
Sayakumane (1737–1791, son of Nokasat)
Fay Na (1791–1811, son of Phra Vorarat, not of royal descent appointed by Siam)
No Muong (1811–1813, son of Fay Na, not of royal descent)
Manoi (1813–1819, nephew of Sayakoummane)
Nho (Chao Yo house of Vientiane) (1819–1827, son of King Anouvong, Kingdom of Vientiane)
1829–1893 Siam annexes Champassak following the Chao Anouvong Rebellion and confirms subsequent kings 
Huy (1828–1840, great grandson of Nokasat)
Nark (1841–1851, brother of Huy)
Boua (1851–1853 regent, 1853 king, son of Huy)
Interregnum (1853–1856)
Kham Nai (1856–1858, son of Huy) 
Interregnum (Chao Chou) (1858–1863)
Kham Souk (1863–1899) son of Huy, French divide kingdom in 1893.
Ratsadanay (Nhouy) (1900–1904) son of Khamsouk, his Kingdom was dissolved but he retained his royal title during French colonization; 1905–1934 given title as regional governor.
Chao Boun Oum (1912-1980), son of Chao Ratsadanay, hereditary prince of Champassak.

See also
Champa
House of Champassak

References

External links
champassak

 
History of Laos
1945 establishments in Asia
1945 disestablishments in Asia
Former kingdoms